Pterostylis ziegeleri, commonly known as the Cape Portland greenhood,  is a plant in the orchid family Orchidaceae and is endemic to Tasmania. Both flowering and non-flowering plants have a rosette of leaves lying flat on the ground and flowering plants have up to eight crowded translucent, pale green flowers with darker green veins.

Description
Pterostylis ziegeleri, is a terrestrial,  perennial, deciduous, herb with an underground tuber. The dorsal sepal is gently curved but suddenly curves downward near the tip and is about the same length as the petals. Flowering occurs in October and November.

Taxonomy and naming
Pterostylis ziegeleri was first formally described in 1998 by David Jones from a specimen collected near Cape Portland and the description was published in Australian Orchid Research. The specific epithet (ziegeleri) honours David Ziegler "who prepared the initial manuscript of the Orchid Atlas of Tasmania.

Distribution and habitat
The Cape Portland greenhood grows in dense, tall, tussock grassland in coastal areas and in the midlands.

Conservation
Pterostylis ziegeleri is listed as "vulnerable" under the Australian Government Environment Protection and Biodiversity Conservation Act 1999 and the Tasmanian Government Threatened Species Protection Act 1995. The main threats to the species are land clearing for agriculture or development, application of fertilisers and inappropriate fire or grazing/slashing regimes.

References

ziegeleri
Endemic orchids of Australia
Orchids of Tasmania
Plants described in 1998